Lyon is a city in France.

Lyon may also refer to:

Places

United Kingdom
 Lyon, Perth and Kinross, Scotland, a location in the U.K.
 Loch Lyon, a lake in Scotland

United States
 Lyon, Mississippi
 Lyon, Missouri
 Lyon College, Batesville, Arkansas
 Lyon County (disambiguation)
 Lyon Mountain (disambiguation)
 Lyon Township (disambiguation)
 Lyon Village, Arlington, Virginia, a neighborhood
 Fort Lyon (disambiguation)

People
 Lyon (surname)

Ancestry and heraldry
 Lyon Court, the institution that regulates heraldry in Scotland
 Lord Lyon King of Arms, head of Lyon Court, a Scottish heraldic official
 Clan Lyon, Scottish clan associated with the lands of Glen Lyon in Perthshire, Scotland

Arts and entertainment
 Lyon (Fire Emblem), the main antagonist in Fire Emblem: The Sacred Stones
 Lyon (Suikoden), a major character in the video game Suikoden V
 Lyon School, a style of painting that flourished around 1800
 Merriman Lyon, a main character in Susan Cooper's The Dark Is Rising book series
 Lyon, an S-Type guitar manufactured by Washburn Guitars

Business
 Lyon's, a chain of restaurants headquartered in the US state of California
 J. Lyons and Co., a chain of restaurants in England
 Lyon & Healy, US company which manufactured harps
 Lyon & Lyon, a US legal company

Religion
 Council of Lyon, two 13th century ecclesiastical councils held in Lyon, France
First Council of Lyon (1245), regarding the Crusades
Second Council of Lyon (1274), regarding papal election procedures

Science 
 Lyon hypothesis, see X-inactivation
 9381 Lyon, a main-belt asteroid discovered in 1993

Sports
 Olympique Lyonnais, a men's football club based in Lyon
 Olympique Lyonnais Féminin, a women's football club based in Lyon

Naval vessels 
 Lyon-class battleship, a proposed fleet of 4 battleships for the French Navy (1914)
 American steamship General Lyon (1864), a US steamship
 USS General Lyon (1860), a US warship in US Civil War
 USS Lyon (AP-71), a US warship of World War II

See also 
 Lyons (disambiguation)
 Lion (disambiguation)
 Lyonnaise (disambiguation)
 Justice Lyon (disambiguation)